IPSS may refer to:

Medicine
 Inferior petrosal sinus sampling, a procedure to help distinguish types of Cushing's disease
 International Prognostic Scoring System, an evaluation method to determine the severity of myelodysplastic syndrome
 International Prostate Symptom Score, a short questionnaire to help screen for benign prostatic hyperplasia (BPH)

Other
 Infrasonic passive seismic spectroscopy, a geological exploration and monitoring technique
 International Packet Switched Service, a telecommunications data transmission protocol
Institute for Peace and Security Studies, a university in Ethiopia

See also
 IPS (disambiguation)